The Executive Tower (Spanish: Torre Ejecutiva) is the official workplace of the President of Uruguay. It is located in front of the Plaza Independencia, in Barrio Centro, Montevideo.

History 
The original project was started in 1965 as a future Palace of Justice, but the 1973 coup d'état interrupted it. By the time the military government ended in 1985, the building was too small for the Uruguayan justice system, so the project remained halted for decades until in March 2006, President Tabaré Vázquez decided to finish the building and use it as an extension of the Estévez Palace. The President's offices were transferred there from the Liberty Building in September 2009.

Despite the name, the building does not actually belong to the Presidency of Uruguay but to a fully government-owned company called Legader S.A., which is in charge of leasing office space to other public and private organizations to finance the work on the building.

The building 
The building has twelve floors, the first nine divided into two areas: 

 South Executive Tower, overlooking the Plaza Independencia, where the Presidency of the Republic, the Office of Planning and Budget and the National Office of Civil Service work.
 North Executive Tower, overlooking the Rambla, where there are units dependent on the Presidency, such as the National Road Safety Unit and the Agency for electronic Government and the Information and Knowledge Society and international organizations.

Gallery

See also 

 Legislative Palace
 Estévez Palace
 President of Uruguay
 General Artigas Central Station

References 

Buildings and structures in Montevideo
Museums in Montevideo
Government of Uruguay
Government buildings completed in 1874
Ciudad Vieja, Montevideo
Government buildings completed in 2008